Walter Wilson (born 1884, date of death unknown) was a British wrestler. He competed at the 1920 and 1924 Summer Olympics.

References

External links
 

1884 births
Year of death missing
Olympic wrestlers of Great Britain
Wrestlers at the 1920 Summer Olympics
Wrestlers at the 1924 Summer Olympics
British male sport wrestlers
Place of birth missing